is a fictional character in the Mario franchise. He plays the role of Luigi's arch-rival and accompanies Wario in spin-offs from the main Mario series, often for the sake of causing mischief and problems. He was created by Camelot employee Fumihide Aoki and is voiced by Charles Martinet, who described Waluigi as someone who has a lot of self-pity and would "cheat to win."

First debuting in the 2000 Nintendo 64 game Mario Tennis to polarized reception from the media, Waluigi has since attained a cult following, especially helped through his use as an Internet meme.

Creation and characteristics

Waluigi was created during the development of the game Mario Tennis, to serve as the bitter rival to Luigi and as a doubles partner for Wario. He was created by Fumihide Aoki and is voiced by Charles Martinet. His name is a portmanteau of Luigi's name and the Japanese adjective  meaning "bad"; hence, a "bad Luigi".

He is said to be a mischievous, cunning man. Martinet stated that the cornerstone of Waluigi's personality is one of self-pity, a character who feels that everything goes right for everyone but himself. As displayed in Mario Power Tennis and Mario Hoops 3-on-3, Waluigi features the ability to summon a body of water and swim towards each game's respective ball, which IGN editor Rob Burman described as "baffling".

Waluigi borrows Wario's design principle as an evil, twisted version of his counterpart, pushing Luigi's leaner body type to the extreme, which renders him particularly skinny and angular, with a pointy chin and thin mustache. While these features contrast strongly with Wario's, the two still share a lot of physical attributes: a large pink nose, pointy shoes, a W-shaped mustache, a wide permanent grin with blocky teeth, and bags under their eyes. He has a high-pitched, nasal voice.

He is the same age as Luigi and wears black overalls, a purple long-sleeved shirt, a purple hat with a yellow "Γ" symbol (an inverted L, paralleling Wario's W as an upside-down M), orange shoes, and white gloves with a yellow "Γ" symbol as well. When asked whether Waluigi was a brother to Wario, Martinet stated that while he did not know, he felt that they were just "two nice, evil guys who found each other".

Appearances
Waluigi's first two appearances were in the Nintendo 64 and Game Boy Color versions of Mario Tennis, establishing himself as Luigi's supposedly long time rival and Wario's doubles partner, whom he would remain partners with for most future installments, the one exception being Mario Tennis: Power Tour, the only time that he appeared in-game without Wario. Since his introduction, Waluigi has appeared as a playable character in every Mario sports game. Notably, in Mario Golf: Toadstool Tour and Mario Power Tennis, he holds up the sign for Camelot Software Planning to signify the game developers in the opening movies.

Alongside Princess Daisy, Waluigi joined the Mario Party series starting with Mario Party 3, where he owns an island filled with traps and explosives. In the game's story mode, he is faced as the penultimate foe after defeating Bowser.

Waluigi appears in the Mario Kart series, first appearing in Mario Kart: Double Dash. He would go on to be featured in all future console installments with the exception of Mario Kart 7, where he was cut due to time constraints despite his course, Waluigi Pinball, being selectable.

Waluigi's most significant role to date was as the main antagonist of Dance Dance Revolution: Mario Mix, in which he wreaks havoc in the Mushroom Kingdom by pilfering special objects called the Music Keys to hypnotize the world with his dancing, hoping to conquer it and spread chaos. The rest of the keys are held by a Blooper, Wario, and Bowser, respectively.

In the Super Smash Bros. series, starting with Brawl, Waluigi appears as a non-playable Assist Trophy item, while his purple color palette appears as one of Luigi's alternate costumes and in later installments, for Mario and Wario as well. During Waluigi's reveal for Super Smash Bros. for Nintendo 3DS and Wii U, game director Masahiro Sakurai jokingly stated that "just because you try hard doesn't mean you'll make it into the battle." He was also used as an example for K.O.ing assist trophies during the gameplay reveal of Super Smash Bros. Ultimate.

As for minor appearances, Waluigi graces in Super Mario Maker as an unlockable Mystery Mushroom costume for Mario to wear in the Super Mario Bros. style. Although he does not make an appearance in Paper Mario: The Thousand-Year Door, if the player has both the Wario emblem and the Luigi emblem equipped at the same time, Mario will be dressed in the colors of Waluigi. In Super Mario Odyssey, an outfit modeled after Waluigi's own can be purchased in-game and worn by Mario after the player has either scanned the Waluigi amiibo or collected enough Power Moons; the description mentions his desire for the spotlight. Waluigi makes a very brief appearance in Mario + Rabbids Kingdom Battle as a figurine in the opening, however, a Rabbid version, named Bwaluigi, appears as a boss alongside Wario's Rabbid counterpart, Bwario.

Reception
Since his appearance in Mario Tennis, Waluigi has received a mixed reception. Gamervision editor Jonathan Cooper wrote an article entitled "Ten Reasons Waluigi is Awesome", listing such qualities as his developed personality, his role in Super Smash Bros. Brawl, and his role in Mario sports games. In the book "Icons of Horror and the Supernatural: An Encyclopedia of Our Worst Nightmares, Volume 1", author S. T. Joshi cites both Waluigi and Wario as examples of alter egos, also as evidence of how popular it is to feature such character archetypes. IGN editor Matt Casamassina described him as a recognizable mascot to many, but also as a beloved one to Nintendo fans. Hiroyuki Takahashi, a developer for Mario Power Tennis listed him, along with his companion Wario, as his favorite character in Power Tennis, describing them both as detestable heels, adding that he likes characters with more personality. Gamingillustrated.com's writer Greg Johnson, during his article about Mario Kart 8, described Waluigi's return as one of the game's bright-sides. An article in Gameranx.com, entitled "Waluigi: Unwrapping the Enigma", dwells in Waluigi's self-pity and ambiguous origins, describing him as one of the most misunderstood characters in video games, and more than capable of holding his own game. In addition, Steve Haske, from Unwinnable.com wrote an article called "Defending Waluigi" that discussed Waluigi's partly negative reception, claiming Waluigi to be an even more interesting character than Wario, praising Waluigi for the comic relief he provides and mentioning his absence as a playable character in Super Smash Bros. Brawl as a sad disrespect to his fans. Evilgeeks.com, a website dedicated towards villains, claimed Waluigi to be Nintendo's most evil character, because of his hatred, greed, and power, and wrote that Waluigi should have his own game simply so that we could see what he is capable of. In addition to those articles, venturebeat.com's writer Chris Hoadley wrote an article called "The Greatness of Waluigi", describing him as the most cynical Mario franchise character, and the greatest one of the last decade. Chris wrote about how Waluigi, despite being constantly ridiculed for his lack of importance, has one of the strongest and most developed personalities of the cast.

Conversely, GameDaily listed him as one of the characters they wanted to kill but were not able to, describing him as "One of the most unimportant characters in video game history". Kotaku editor Mike Fahey commented that Waluigi was his personal most annoying video game character. GamesRadar described Waluigi as a "lame-o villain" in an otherwise great game, referencing Mario Tennis. Editor Henry Gilbert titled his section "Waluigi: The worst character ever", suggesting that the creation process involved the developers of Mario Tennis having no one to fill the final character slot, and conceiving him as an "evil Luigi". He describes such an act as "plunging to the bottom of the intellectual barrel". He also calls Waluigi "disgustingly tall and thin" as opposed to Wario, who he calls a "fatass". He later states that the staff of GamesRadar feels that Waluigi is seen as "less than legitimate" by Nintendo, who he feels may not find him good enough to appear in a main Mario or Wario title. IGN editor Lucas M. Thomas discussed him as a possible, yet unlikely, candidate for a "second banana" character to be playable in Super Smash Bros. Brawl, commenting that Waluigi, amongst other sidekick characters, are not well-liked. IGN staff, while praising Bowser as one of the most memorable video game villains, criticized both Waluigi and Wario as being "evil twin knockoffs".

Despite Waluigi's popularity gain as an Internet meme, he has yet to appear outside of Mario spin-offs. His lack of playability within Super Smash Bros. Ultimate (confirmed when the character was announced as a non-playable Assist Trophy during E3 2018) was met with negative reception from the gaming press and social media, with websites such as Reddit and Twitter leading the outcry. Online Change.org petitions have been created in support of Waluigi being added as a playable character, garnering thousands of supporters. IGN's Joe Skrebels described his non-playable status within the game as "...a slap in the face for those who want a playable Waluigi."

Former Nintendo of America president Reggie Fils-Aimé has acknowledged the popularity of Waluigi and the desire to have him playable in Super Smash Bros. Ultimate, citing that series director Masahiro Sakurai "...will be aware of the groundswell of support that appeared for Waluigi. And in the end, it's his decision to make."

Notes

References

Fictional bullies
Fictional Italian people in video games
Internet memes introduced in 2000
Male characters in video games
Mario (franchise) enemies
Nintendo protagonists
Video game bosses
Video game characters introduced in 2000
Video game memes
Video game sidekicks
Wario (series)